The 2007 Coupe Internationale de Nice was the 12th edition of an annual senior-level international figure skating competition held in Nice, France. It was held between October 18 and October 21, 2007 at the Palais des Sports Jean Bouin. Skaters competed in the disciplines of men's singles, ladies' singles, and pair skating on the levels of senior, junior, and novice.

Senior results

Men

Ladies

Pairs

Junior results

Men

Ladies

Novice results

Boys

Girls

External links

 12th International Cup of Nice
 ISU: 2007 Coupe de Nice

Coupe Internationale de Nice
Coupe Internationale De Nice, 2007